Fabio Lauria (born 30 August 1986) is an Italian footballer who plays for U.S. Adriese.

Biography
Born in Naples, Campania, Lauria started his career at Umbria team Ternana. In mid-2004 he was sold to Reggiana in co-ownership deal. In June 2005 Reggiana bought him outright by submitted the highest bid to Lega Calcio after no agreement could be formed between the two clubs. However, in August 2005 he was sold to Serie B team Arezzo. He then spent two seasons on loan to Serie C1 teams Martina and Lanciano despite Arezzo relegated in 2007.

In 2008–09 season he played 18 league games for Arezzo. After that season he left for Lumezzane in one-year deal. On 24 July 2010 he signed a new one-year deal. He received a call-up to Lumezzane pre-season camp in 2011 but in August terminated his contract.
In August 2011, Lauria signed a contract with the FBC Unione Venezia, and is one of the most influential players of the team.

References

External links
 Football.it Profile 
 	Lumezzane Profile 
 FIGC  
 

Italian footballers
Serie B players
Serie C players
Serie D players
Ternana Calcio players
A.C. Reggiana 1919 players
S.S. Arezzo players
A.S.D. Martina Calcio 1947 players
S.S. Virtus Lanciano 1924 players
F.C. Lumezzane V.G.Z. A.S.D. players
Venezia F.C. players
Matera Calcio players
A.C. Cuneo 1905 players
Parma Calcio 1913 players
Association football forwards
Footballers from Naples
1986 births
Living people